Aziz Kandi (also Romanized as ‘Azīz Kandī; also known as Ghaẕanfarābād) is a village in Gejlarat-e Sharqi Rural District, Aras District, Poldasht County, West Azerbaijan Province, Iran. At the 2006 census, its population was 173, in 31 families.

References 

Populated places in Poldasht County